Pershing was a station on the Chicago Transit Authority's South Side Elevated Line, which is now part of the Green Line. The station was located at Pershing Road and State Street in the Douglas neighborhood of Chicago. Pershing was situated south of Tech–35th, which is now named 35th–Bronzeville–IIT, and north of Indiana. Pershing opened on June 6, 1892, and closed on August 1, 1949.

References

Defunct Chicago "L" stations
Railway stations in the United States opened in 1892
Railway stations closed in 1949
1892 establishments in Illinois
1949 disestablishments in Illinois